The Schartschrofen is a rocky summit, 1,968 m high, in the Tannheim Mountains, a sub-group of the Allgäu Alps. It lies northwest of the Rote Flüh and south of the col of Füssener Jöchl.

Ascent 

There are two waymarked paths up the Schartschrofen. The normal route runs from the valley of Tannheimer Tal via the col of Füssener Jöchl – to this point the cable car may be taken from Grän – continuing to the Hallgernjoch col and from there to the top. Along the 150-metre-high southeastern arête runs the Friedberger Klettersteig, protected throughout its length, initially leading along the ridge and then after a detour into the south flank finally climbing a gully to the summit.

Literature 

 Dieter Seibert: Allgäuer Alpen Alpin Alpine Club Guide. Munich, Bergverlag Rudolf Rother, 2004. 
 Eugen E. Hüsler: Klettersteigatlas Alpen. Munich, Bruckmann Verlag, 6th edition, 2005.

External links 

One-thousanders of Austria
Mountains of Tyrol (state)
Mountains of the Alps
Allgäu Alps